Nikolay Vasilev Ilov (born 30 April 1932) is a Bulgarian former basketball player. He competed in the men's tournament at the 1956 Summer Olympics, and the 1960 Summer Olympics.

References

External links

1932 births
Living people
Bulgarian men's basketball players
Olympic basketball players of Bulgaria
Basketball players at the 1956 Summer Olympics
Basketball players at the 1960 Summer Olympics
Sportspeople from Pleven